Damning with faint praise is an English idiom, expressing oxymoronically that half-hearted or insincere praise may act as oblique criticism or condemnation. In simpler terms, praise is given, but only given as high as mediocrity, which may be interpreted as passive-aggressive.

History of the term
The concept can be found in the work of the Hellenistic sophist and philosopher Favorinus (c. 110 CE) who observed that faint and half-hearted praise was more harmful than loud and persistent abuse.

The explicit phrasing of the modern English idiomatic expression was first published by Alexander Pope in his 1734 poem, "Epistle to Dr Arbuthnot" in Prologue to the Satires.
Damn with faint praise, assent with civil leer,
And without sneering, teach the rest to sneer;
Willing to wound, and yet afraid to strike,
Just hint a fault, and hesitate dislike.
— "Epistle to Dr Arbuthnot" by Alexander Pope (1688–1744)

According to William Shepard Walsh, "There is a faint anticipation in William Wycherley's Double Dealer, "and libels everybody with dull praise," But a closer parallel is in Phineas Fletcher, —"
When needs he must, yet faintly then he praises,
Somewhat the deed, much more the means he raises:
So marreth what he makes, and praising most, dispraises.
— "The Purple Island" by Phineas Fletcher

The inversion "praising with faint damns" is a more modern coinage, though it certainly goes as far back as 1888.

The concept was widely used in literature in the eighteenth century, for example in Tobias Smollet's Roderick Random - "I impart some of mine to her - am mortified at her faint praise".

Examples 
 1917, Lucy Maud Montgomery, The Alpine Path: The Story of My Career:
 "They wrote that 'Our readers report that they find some merit in your story, but not enough to warrant its acceptance'."
 1975, Paul Grice, giving an example of conversational implicature:
 A professor is writing a testimonial about a pupil who is a candidate for a philosophy job, and his letter reads as follows: "Dear Sir, Mr. X's command of English is excellent, and his attendance at tutorials has been regular. Yours, etc."
 2009, interview with Encyclopædia Britannica president Jorge Cauz in the Sydney Morning Herald:
 "… [Cauz] said a big problem was that many users considered Wikipedia to be 'fine' or 'good enough'."

See also
Backhanded compliment
Polite fiction
Sarcasm

References

Sources
 Ammer, Christine. (1997). The American Heritage Dictionary of Idioms. New York: Houghton Mifflin Harcourt. ; 
 Browne, William Hardcastle. (1900). Odd Derivations of Words, Phrases, Slang, Synonyms and Proverbs. Philadelphia: Arnold. 
 Hirsch, Eric Donald Hirsch, Joseph F. Kett and James S. Trefil. (2002). The New Dictionary of Cultural Literacy.  Boston: Houghton Mifflin. ; ; 
 Ichikawa, Sanki. (1964). The Kenkyusha Dictionary of Current English Idioms. Tokyo: Kenkyusha. 
 Pope, Alexander and Henry Walcott Boynton. (1901). The Rape of the Lock. An essay on Man and Epistle to Dr. Arbuthnot. Boston: Houghton, Mifflin Co. 
 Walsh, William Shepard. (1892). Handy-book of Literary Curiosities. Philadelphia: Lippincott.
 __. (1908). The International Encyclopedia of Prose and Poetical Quotations from the Literature of the World. Toronto: C. Clark.

External links

Alexander Pope. "Epistle to Dr. Arbuthnot," annotated text of the poem

English-language idioms
Linguistic controversies